The Dandora Waste To Energy Power Station, also Nairobi Waste To Energy Power Station, is a planned 45 megawatts waste-fired thermal power plant in the city of Nairobi, the capital of Kenya. The power station is owned and is under development by Kenya Ministry of Energy. Feasibility studies will inform the design of the power plant. The energy generated here will be sold to Kenya Power and Lighting Company, for integration into the Kenyan grid.

Location
The power plant will occupy real estate adjacent to Nairobi Sewage Treatment Works, in Ruai, in extreme northeastern Nairobi County, close to the border with Kiambu County.

History
Nairobi, Kenya's capital city, had an estimated population of 4.5 million people, as of February 2019. This dumpsite receives a daily load, estimated between 2,000 and 3,000 tonnes of solid waste, from Nairobi's homes, businesses and industry. The dumpsite already holds approximately 1.8 million tonnes of waste, more than three times the 500,000 metric tonnes it was designed to hold.

In July 2021, following a lawsuit filed by residents near the dumpsite, a Nairobi court ordered the Nairobi Metropolitan Services (NMS), the entity running Nairobi County at that time, to close down the dumpsite within six months and clean it up after closure.

Overview
It is envisaged that the Kenya Ministry of Energy will build and own this power station, on land owned by Nairobi County and administered by NMS. Kenya Electricity Generating Company will operate and maintain the power station. As of February 2022, the plan had been presented to the Cabinet of Kenya for approval and funding. In June 2022, it  was reported that a consortium comprising Hitachi Zosen Inova based in Switzerland and Sintmond Group based in Kenya was working with the Kenyan authorities to develop this power station.

Cost of construction
In November 2021, the construction cost was reported as approximately US$197 million.

See also
 List of power stations in Kenya
 Kinshasa Thermal Power Station
 Kibo Gauteng Thermal Power Station
 Kakamega Waste To Energy Plant
 Pomona Waste To Energy Power Station

References

External links
 Approximate Location of Nairobi Waste to Energy Power Station, Ruai, Nairobi
 Plans to put up waste energy plant at dumpsite to delay As of 9 February 2021.

Power stations in Kenya
Proposed energy infrastructure
Nairobi